The Princeton–Yale football rivalry is an American college football rivalry between the Princeton Tigers of Princeton University and the Yale Bulldogs of Yale University. The football rivalry is among the oldest in American sports.

Significance

The rivalry is one of the oldest continuous rivalries in American sports, the oldest continuing rivalry in the history of American football, and is constituent to the Big Three academic, athletic and social rivalry among alumni and students associated with Harvard, Yale and Princeton universities.

The Kentucky Derby and Westminster Kennel Club Dog Show example American sporting events that are older or have been engaged continuously longer than this contest.

Princeton claims 28 collegiate football national championships. Yale claims 27 collegiate national football championship. And the rivalry has been played seriously beyond the gridiron, sometimes for future undergraduate matriculants. Princeton's Undergraduate Dean of Admissions in 2002 was charged with hacking the Yale undergraduate admissions website.

Princeton and Yale first met on the gridiron in 1873 and soon dominated the sport. Princeton has been considered the best football program of the nineteenth century. Princeton played the University of Virginia in 1890, a contest considered the first major North–South intersectional football matchup. Princeton won, 116–0. Yale's record was 100–4–5 in the 1900s.

In the mid to late 20th century a saying regarding the fortunes of the Yale football program gained currency among different constituencies. As reported in the November 9, 1970 issue of Sports Illustrated, the saying offered that the alumni would rather beat Harvard, the coaches would rather beat Dartmouth, and "the players would rather beat Princeton".

Some past teams and participants have been noteworthy:

During the 25 seasons spanning 1869 through 1894 the consensus collegiate national champion was either Princeton (16 titles) or Yale (13 titles);

Three of four Heisman Trophy winners affiliated with Ivy League football programs participated in the rivalry: Clint Frank and Larry Kelley for Yale, and Dick Kazmaier for Princeton. Frank won the first Maxwell Award in 1937 and Kazmaier won the Award in 1951;

Twenty nine members of the College Football Hall of Fame have been associated with Yale's football program. Twenty six members of the Hall of Fame have been associated with Princeton's football program;

Princeton won the 1950 and 1951 Lambert Trophy. Princeton last claimed a collegiate national championship in 1950. Yale shared the Lambert in 1960 with the Navy team;

The first time a movie camera recorded a football game was the November 14, 1903 Princeton–Yale contest. Thomas Alva Edison manned the camera;

Twenty-five teams, eleven representing Princeton and fourteen representing Yale, have won outright or shared the Ivy League football title;

Only The Rivalry, between Lafayette and Lehigh, has been contested more often in football.

The Princeton–Yale football rivalry, many contests scheduled on Thanksgiving at the Polo Grounds or in the New York metropolitan area during the late nineteenth century, is older and has been played more often than the  Harvard–Yale, Army–Navy, Cornell–Penn, Columbia–Cornell, Penn State–Pitt, Amherst–Williams, Minnesota–Wisconsin, Indiana–Purdue, UNC–UVA, Auburn–Georgia, Cal–Stanford, or Andover–Exeter football rivalries.

Yale leads the series, 79–55–10.

Notable contests
1873
College of New Jersey captain Cyrus Dershimer led the Tigers to victory, 3–0, November 15, 1873, in the inaugural contest. "A leather covered, egg-shaped projectile was tossed and kicked on a field that measured 120 yards in length and 75 yards in width." The College of New Jersey's trustees adopted the current name in 1896, announced during the school's sesquicentennial celebration.

1876
Yale won, 2–0, on Thanksgiving Day in Hoboken, New Jersey. The contest was the first football game of any type played on Thanksgiving Day.

1879
The 1879 game, a season-ending scoreless tie in Hoboken, was Frederic Remington's last game at Yale. Walter Camp captained the Yale team. The programs, College of New Jersey 4–0–1 and Yale 3–0–2, were named consensus co-national champions.

Remington, reputed to dunk his uniform in animal blood "to look more businesslike on the field," removed from New Haven to take care of his ailing father, then headed to the American frontier. Remington's illustrations of cowboys there became iconic images of the mythic West.

The contest has been considered the first in the series "played off school grounds" on a Thanksgiving.

1884
The 1884 contest ends in a scoreless tie in front of a noteworthy 15,000 spectators in New York City.

1888
Yale outscores opponents 698–0 during the season. Defeats College of New Jersey 10–0 to end season with 13–0 record.

1890
Yale won, 32–0, on Thanksgiving Day, in Brooklyn, New York. The victory is first of 37 consecutive wins, with 36 shutouts. Yale football letterwinner Federic Remington depicts on canvas a Yale athlete scoring a touchdown that is displayed prominently in Ray Tompkins House, the administrative headquarters for Yale athletics.

1891
Yale won, 19–0, at the Polo Grounds. Yale swept its 13-game schedule and held scoreless all thirteen opponents; in turn, Yale scored 488 points.

1893
The College of New Jersey's best team in the nineteenth century was the 1893 team. The squad defeated Yale, 6–0, on Thanksgiving Day in New York City. Princeton's victory was the only loss suffered by four time consensus All-American and College Football Hall of Famer Frank Hinkey during his Yale career. The victory ended Yale's thirty-seven game win streak.

1897
The Yale Banner 1956 opens its feature "end of an era", reporting Yale's football history up to the impending start of round-robin play among the appointed eight Ivy League programs in a few months, with the following quote, supposedly "from a father of a former player":

"And those girls in Blue! Mothers, sisters, sweethearts, their radiance is over you now. The loving worship of fair women for brave men, which preserves the courage of the human race is yours now.One and all of them would tear out their heart strings to bring you victory. Yale calls you. Where Yale calls there is no such thing as fail. Now go. Do or die like heroes and gentlemen and may the God of Battles crown the Blue with victory!" Yale won the game, 6–0.

Charles Ives, a composer who championed American vernacular stylings in American classical music, spectated the contest on November 20. The victory inspired the composer's Yale–Princeton Game.

Ives proposed successfully to Harmony Twichell after the 1905 contest in New Haven. Rev. Joseph Twichell, Ives's father-in-law, was a member of an investigative committee, convened at the behest of the Harvard Board of Overseers, to determine the extent of brutality, as well as character-building, on college and prep school gridirons post the notorious 1894 Harvard–Yale game. Groton founder Endicott Peabody was a committee member.

1906
Scoreless tie nets undefeated season for both programs and co-national championship. The season is first played under auspices of the NCAA's forerunner, the IAAUS, formed to reform unsportsmanlike play in the sport. The forward pass is now legal.

1914
Yale, by 19–14, won its debut at Palmer Stadium on November 14, 1914. Palmer Stadium is the second largest stadium in the country. Yale Bowl is the largest.

1922
Grantland Rice's Team of Destiny, the 1922 Princeton Tigers football team, completed an undefeated season with 6–0 victory. Bill Roper's squad is acknowledged as national champions for the season.

1934
November 17 was the last time eleven football athletes, future Downtown Athletic Club trophy winner Larry Kelley among them, as a unit played without substitutes to the final whistle from the opening kickoff in a major college football game. Yale defeated Princeton, 7–0, in front of 53,000 fans at Palmer Stadium.

Larry Kelley scored on an 80+ yard pass play as Yale was an obvious underdog versus one of Princeton's all-time great teams.

Princeton sought its sixteenth straight victory in a streak extending back to the 1933 season. Princeton coach Fritz Crisler, the acknowledged father of two-platoon football, guided the Tigers to a 7–1 record one year after an undefeated season and a national championship. The 1934 team outscored opponents 280–38.

The contest inspired two monographs. "Football's Last Iron Men: 1934, Yale vs. Princeton and One Stunning Upset" by Norman Macht, University of Nebraska Press, Bison Books, published in 2010, and "Yale's Ironmen: A Story of Football and Lives In The Decade of The Great Depression and Beyond" by New York Times sportswriter and Yale alumnus William N. Wallace, published by Iunverse Press in 2005.

1937
College Football Hall of Fame member Fritz Crisler coached his final game for Princeton versus Yale in 1937. Crisler's record was 2–3–1 versus his Yale counterparts (1–3 versus Ducky Pond) but he led Princeton to consensus national championships the two seasons he defeated Yale. Crisler coached against Yale's Downtown Athletic and Heisman Trophy winners Larry Kelley and Clint Frank, and he coached in the Ironmen game. He lost the 1937 contest, 26–0.

1949–1951
The 1949–1951 contests, each won by Princeton, featured Dick Kazmaier, the eventual winner of the 1951 Heisman Trophy, Maxwell Award, Walter Camp Award, and Associated Press Athlete of the Year. Kazmaier received 506 first place votes (first, second and third place votes are tallied) and 1,777 total points with the second-place finisher receiving, by contrast, 42 first place votes in the balloting. Kazmaier was a double threat—to run or to pass—in the single wing offense.

Princeton won 21–13,  47–12 in New Haven (most points ever scored by a visiting team at the Bowl) and 27–0. Kazmaier appeared on the cover of the November 19, 1951 issue of Time, two days after the 27–0 victory.

Kazmaier dominated the contests; he, for example, tossed three touchdown passes and ran for another touchdown in the 27–0 victory his senior season. (Earlier in the season Kazmaier and teammates crushed Harvard, 54–13.) Kazmaier won the coveted Heisman Trophy for the season.

1955
Princeton captain and future athletic  director Royce Flippin led the Tigers to a 13–0 at packed and partisan Palmer Stadium. Over 46,000 spectators saw contest. "Overall, Yale is our biggest rival", Flippin remarked years later, "so we took the game seriously."

Yale defeated an able Army team the week before and was ranked nationally but Princeton provided unsolved problems for Yale. Flippin, who was later also athletic director at MIT, opened the scoring in the third quarter and Princeton won, 13–0, after Joe DiRenzo returned an interception for a touchdown late in the fourth quarter.
Robert Casciola, later a head coach  the program, was on the field for Princeton.

1960
The 1960 Ivy League football season ended with Yale  7–0 and Princeton 6–1. Yale, captained by Mike Pyle, who switched to offensive tackle from center for the season, won before 65,000 spectators at the Bowl. The 1960 Yale team is the program's sole undefeated, untied team since 1923. The team was ranked 14th in the season-ending AP poll, in front of 16th ranked Penn State and 19th ranked Syracuse.

Pyle captained the Chicago Bears during its 1963 NFL Championship season until the end of the 1969 season.

1967
Yale won 29–7 at Palmer Stadium, the first of fourteen consecutive victories versus Princeton. The Tigers had enjoyed a six-game winning streak versus the Bulldogs. Calvin Hill and Brian Dowling led the Bulldogs during the contest. Cheerleading captain George W. Bush lead Yalies post-contest. Bush was arrested by local police for attempting to tear down a goalpost.

1979
Yale won 35–10, led by future three time Super Bowl winner Ken Hill. The running back  gained 129 yards on 19 carries. Yale was undefeated at 5–0 in the League and Princeton 4–1 before kickoff. Yale clinched sole possession of the football title with the lop-sided victory. The next day's Sunday New York Times game story headline announced "Yale Takes Game, Ivy Crown And Purloined Mascot Home".

At halftime Handsome Dan XII, named Bingo (and, in fact, a female pedigreed bulldog in the care of Yale professor Rollie Osterweiss), was returned to caregivers. Princeton undergrads Mark Hallam, Jamie Herbert, Rod Sheperd, and Scott Thompson posed as members of the Yale cheerleading squad and requested Bingo's appearance for publicity photographs. Osterweiss obliged the perpetrators. Bingo, adorned with an orange and black scarf, was handed off to actual Yale cheerleaders at halftime.

1981
Princeton, in Palmer Stadium, ended a fourteen-game loss streak to Yale, 35–31, November 14. Bob Holly, a future Super Bowl champion with the Washington Redskins, passed for 501 yards and wide receiver Derek Graham accounted for 278 yards, both Princeton records. Rich Diana ran for a Yale record 222 yards.

The Princeton Athletic News deemed the contest the Princeton game of the century.

Yale was 8–0 including a nationally televised "upset" victory versus Navy. Yale Head Coach Carm Cozza's record was 14–1 versus Princeton before the final whistle. Princeton had a 3–4–1 overall record, and had lost to Maine 55–44 the week before.

Holly, a right handed quarterback, scored the winning touchdown on a left roll out with four seconds remaining.

1988
Jason Garrett, captain of the 1988 Princeton team and Asa S. Bushnell Award winner as the Ivy League Player of the Year, quarterbacked a 24–7 victory over Yale in New Haven. Garrett, who played professionally in three leagues and won two Super Bowl rings with the Dallas Cowboys, is the former head coach of the Cowboys. Garrett was named NFL Coach of the Year for the 2016 season.

1997
Princeton defeated Yale 9–0 in front of a little more than 6,000 spectators on a blustery and cloudy afternoon at the Meadowlands, home to the NFL New York Jets and New York Giants. The following day's New York Times game story, by William N. Wallace, began: "A century ago Princeton – Yale was the game, played at the Polo Grounds in New York from 1887 to 1896 before capacity crowds." That was not the case across the Hudson River just west of the mentioned Polo Grounds, now home to a rundown New York City Housing Authority development.

The Princeton Tigers football team spent the season on the road while Princeton Stadium was constructed. The Yale game was the sole game Princeton played in New Jersey in 1997. Palmer Stadium had been demolished for the construction of Princeton Stadium on the same site. William Powers, once an All Ivy punter for Princeton, contributed $10 million to the Princeton athletic department. Princeton Stadium's playing surface is named in honor of his family.

Game results

See also 
 List of NCAA college football rivalry games
 List of most-played college football series in NCAA Division I

References

College football rivalries in the United States
Princeton Tigers football
Yale Bulldogs football